Store Norske Spitsbergen Kulkompani (SNSK), or simply Store Norske, is a Norwegian coal mining company based on the Svalbard archipelago. It was formed in 1916, after a Norwegian purchase of the American Arctic Coal Company (ACC).

The company has 360 employees and operated two coal mines. The larger one was located in the Sveagruva settlement, about 60 km south of Longyearbyen. The Svea Nord longwall mine has an annual output of 2 million tonnes of bituminous coal. A third of it is sold for metallurgical purposes. The managing director of Store Norske Spitsbergen Kulkompani was Per Andersson. The Sveagruva mine closed in 2017.

The Store Norske Spitsbergen Kulkompani has a shipping port at Cape Amsterdam, 15 km from Sveagruva.

In 2021, the Store Norske Spitsbergen Kulkompani was ranked no. 81 in the Arctic Environmental Responsibility Index (AERI) that covers 120 oil, gas, and mining companies involved in resource extraction north of the Arctic Circle.

History 
Store Norske Spitsbergen Kulkompani was founded in 1916.

Former chief executive officers
 Hilmar Reksten
 Einar Sverdrup
 Robert Hermansen

References

External links

 Company website

Coal companies of Norway
Government-owned companies of Norway
Companies based in Svalbard
Non-renewable resource companies established in 1916
1916 establishments in Norway
Longyearbyen
Mining in Svalbard